The 2015 Hero Indian Super League was the second season of the Indian Super League, a professional football league played in India since 2014. The season features eight teams. The regular season kicked off on 3 October and ended on 6 December, while the finals began on 11 December, which will conclude with the final match on 20 December. The defending champions Atlético de Kolkata were eliminated in the semi-finals by Chennaiyin FC. The final was played between Goa and Chennaiyin on 20 December 2015 at the Fatorda Stadium in Goa. Chennayin were crowned as champions defeating Goa 3–2 in the final.

Teams

Stadiums and locations

Personnel and sponsorship

Head coaching changes

Roster changes

Marquee players

Foreign players
Besides the marquee player, each Indian Super League side must sign at least eight foreign players with the maximum capped at 10.

Regular season

Playoffs

Bracket

Statistics

Source: Indian Super League website

Scoring

Top scorers

Top Indian scorers

Hat-tricks

Assists

Clean Sheets

Attendance

Source: Indian Super League website

Average home attendances
Note: Table lists in order of average attendance.

"Change" refers to change in figures wrt previous edition of the tournament.

Highest attendances

Source:Official club websites and Indian Super League.

Awards

Source: Indian Super League website

Hero of the Match

ISL Emerging Player of the Match

End-of-season awards

See also

 2015 Atlético de Kolkata season
 2015 Chennaiyin FC season
 2015 Delhi Dynamos FC season
 2015 FC Goa season
 2015 Kerala Blasters FC season
 2015 Mumbai City FC season
 2015 NorthEast United FC season
 2015 FC Pune City season

References

External links
 

 
Indian Super League seasons
1
India